William McNamee (1891 – 10 June 1935) was a Scottish footballer who played as a centre half, primarily for Hamilton Academical.

McNamee was selected to play for Scotland in an unofficial 'Victory International' in 1919, but by the end of the following year he had fallen out of favour at hometown club Accies, where he had spent eight seasons, and moved on to Airdrieonians for a short spell.

References

Date of birth uncertain
1891 births
1935 deaths
Footballers from Hamilton, South Lanarkshire
Association football defenders
Scottish footballers
Strathclyde F.C. players
Hamilton Academical F.C. players
Airdrieonians F.C. (1878) players
Scottish Football League players
Scottish Junior Football Association players
Scotland wartime international footballers